DWTD may refer to:
 Dumb Ways to Die, an Australian public service announcement campaign
 DWTD, a mixtape by Joohoney

See also
 Deal with the Devil (disambiguation)
 Dominic Walsh Dance Theater (DWDT), a dance company in Houston, Texas